Misuse of Drugs Act may refer to:

Misuse of Drugs Act 1971 in the United Kingdom
Misuse of Drugs Act 1975 in New Zealand
Misuse of Drugs Act 1977 in Ireland
Misuse of Drugs Act (Belize)
Misuse of Drugs Act (Singapore)

See also
Controlled Substances Act